2 Die 4 is a novel by British author Nigel Hinton first published in 2009. It follows the story a fourteen year boy named Ryan who bought a high tech mobile phone but it negatively affected him and made scary things happen.

Concept
The author based the novel on the way someone calls but stays silent and imagined how scary it would be if someone kept doing that. He also based it on how mobile phones can be fun and useful yet users can be traced by the signal from them. He imagined if someone scary and dangerous traced them then worked from there.

Plot
At a car boot sale Ryan came across a mobile phone with a large screen and gold casing. The salesman told him it had features like voice control, Television, music and video downloads and satellite tracking. He was willing to sell it for £30 and knocked it to £20 seeing Ryan's surprised look. At that point Ryan was sure it was stolen but the salesman persuaded to try it and Ryan saw the model number DIAVOLO 666. Ryan was then told the phone did not need charging and calls and texts were free. In the end he got it for £10 and the salesman left immediately. At home Ryan found that the phone had a channel called Diavolo Special that showed violent and pornographic films.

That night the phone's screen flashed on and off with a figure somewhere between a man and a goat. Ryan got the feeling that something was in his bedroom when the light was off. Then the nightmares began. The phone appeared to read Ryan's mind switching to the channel reflecting his thoughts but switched to Diavolo Special most. One night the phone woke Ryan then it displayed the Goat-Man and a creature between a dragon and a dinosaur with sharp teeth. Once again he had the feeling of scary beings in his room. From that point he slept with the light on. From the next morning the phone displayed the Goat-Man when Ryan turned it on. One morning the number 23 appeared under the face. For the next three mornings two new numbers appeared until it stopped at 23553110. Ryan could not make any sense out of it. Two days later the word PAYBACK appeared above the digits.

On his way out of the shopping centre Ryan saw the flying creature from the phone. He saw it prey on two starlings but no one else in the street noticed. Ryan saw the creature again but none of his friends could see it. His mother Jenny asked why Ryan left the light on and her boyfriend Colin, who Ryan did not get along with, suggested he might be having panic attacks having experienced them himself at Ryan's age. This finally gave Ryan a reason to like him. One day Ryan felt unsafe at home alone with the impression of the scary beings around. He typed the number 23553110 into the phone's Sat Spy thinking it might be a postcode but the phone came out with the sound of screaming people. One morning the phone rang and when Ryan answered the words 'The time is nearly up.' came in a menacing whisper. Ryan became fearful that he was going to die but did not want to give up the phone. The phone rang and played the same message about time nearly up when he was left home alone.

During the day on Halloween Ryan used the phone's Sat Spy to track his friends and joined them at the bowling alley. That evening Ryan went to a party at Brandon's house after Colin convinced his mother to let him go. A girl named Danielle pointed out that Ryan's phone appeared to display the time but it was an hour ahead. Ryan realised that it meant the payback was to take place at 23:55 that evening.

Ryan left to get home before the payback fearing that something was going to happen. He took the bus to the station car park and cut across the industrial estate. Ryan phoned home where Colin answered and agreed to meet him on his way. He got the impression that the flying creature was hovering around. Just before leaving the estate a man confronted Ryan with a knife and demanded he handed over his money. He was unhappy with the small amount and felt Ryan's phone. Ryan handed it over and told him how to use it. The thief got the same nosebleed Ryan had when he got the phone then he ordered Ryan to lie flat and not follow him.

As the thief reached the road the phone gave out a high-pitched whine then the flying creature went towards him. The thief tried to escape but the creature pushed him onto the main road where he was hit by a car then run over by a van. At the crash site Ryan found the crushed remains of the phone which melted into the tarmac. Colin met him there and the two of them walked home.

References

External links
 Review from Fantasy Book Review

2009 British novels
Novels by Nigel Hinton